Hallmark Movies & Mysteries (formerly known as Hallmark Movie Channel, and also known as HMM) is an American digital cable and satellite television channel owned by Crown Media Holdings. The channel was spun off from sister network Hallmark Channel, and airs family-oriented feature and television films along with a limited number of murder- and mystery-themed television series.

As of February 2015, Hallmark Movies & Mysteries is available to approximately 55,827,000 pay television households (48% of households with television) in the United States.

History

Hallmark Movie Channel
The Hallmark Movie Channel was launched in January 2004 as an outlet for additional movies and series available to the Hallmark Channel (HC) that the station did not have the airtime to run. Two series were initially picked up, with Magnum, P.I. available at launch and Diagnosis Murder available in January 2005. Crown Media shifted showing their Mystery Movie film series in 2008 from Hallmark Channel to this channel as they were having more success with lighter romances. On April 2, 2008, the channel was switched over to HD format.

AT&T U-verse dropped Hallmark Channel and sister channel Hallmark Movie Channel on September 1, 2010, due to a carriage dispute. As of July 23, 2015, both channels have returned to U-verse. In July 2012 during a retransmission consent dispute with Hearst Television, the network was slotted by Time Warner Cable in place of Hearst's broadcast television stations as a 'free preview' and make-good for viewers until the dispute was settled.

Hallmark Movies & Mysteries
On March 14, 2014, Crown Media Holdings announced that Hallmark Movie Channel would be rebranded as Hallmark Movies & Mysteries in October 2014. In rebranding, the company was trying to differentiate between the two channels, which feature different programming. With the new name, Hallmark reestablished a mystery wheel series under the name "Original Mystery Wheel" in 2015, having previously had one on the Hallmark Channel from 2004 to 2008.

After running several repeats of the Jesse Stone films in 2015, the channel agreed to pick up the next two films in the series from Sony Pictures Television. On Monday, November 11, 2015, Hallmark Movie Channel started its first "The Most Wonderful Movies of Christmas" seasonal programming.

On July 28, 2017, it was reported that Crown Media would add a brand new cable network titled Hallmark Drama, which launched on October 1, 2017, and a subscription video on demand streaming service titled Hallmark Movies Now on October 3 of the same year.

Two new development deals along with new installments of existing movie series were announced by the channel. Al Roker signed a deal for his The Midnight Show Murders: A Billy Blessing Novel and Scandal inspiration Judy Smith, a crisis communications specialist, made a deal for the movie The Adjuster.  Although The Adjuster never made it into production, in 2021, Smith was developing a new film titled Redemption in Cherry Springs.

Programming
The channel features mystery, western, and family-friendly movies and mini-series mainly from the Hallmark Channel library, notably original films that had once premiered on Hallmark Channel at an earlier date. The channel also has featured a small number of films from Hallmark Hall of Fame, Walt Disney Pictures and Touchstone Pictures. Hallmark Movie Channel also broadcasts the McBride, Murder 101, Jane Doe, and Mystery Woman film series, as well as later Perry Mason and Matlock made-for-TV movies produced after the end of those series.

The first original movie to premiere on the channel was Son of the Dragon on April 2, 2008, this was followed by a continuous stream of original movie premieres. In July 2010, the channel began airing scripted television series to its schedule. Currently, these syndicated series mostly include mystery series and Hallmark Channel original series.

As a companion to Hallmark Channel's "Countdown to Christmas" event, the network also airs a large number of Christmas-themed films during the later months of the year, branded as "Miracles of Christmas".

Wheel series 

 Mystery Wheel is a movie wheel series started in 2015 after the rebranding of the channel. The original movies series were Garage Sale Mystery, Gourmet Detective and Murder, She Baked (based on Joanne Fluke’s Hannah Swensen Mystery series).
 Signature Mystery is a movie wheel series started in 2019 featuring Aurora Teagarden Mysteries, Garage Sale Mysteries, Gourmet Detective, Morning Show Mysteries, Hailey Dean Mysteries, later expanded to include the new Chronicle Mysteries, Crossword Mysteries, Mystery 101, Martha's Vineyard Mysteries, Matchmaker Mysteries, Ruby Herring Mysteries, Darrow & Darrow, Emma Fielding Mysteries, Murder, She Baked, Signed, Sealed, Delivered, Flower Shop Mysteries and Picture Perfect Mysteries.

Current Programming
Aurora Teagarden Mysteries
Crossword Mysteries
Diagnosis Murder
Drop Dead Diva
Garage Sale Mysteries
Gourmet Detective Mysteries
Emma Fielding Mysteries
Monk
Murder, She Wrote
Psych
Signed, Sealed, Delivered

Former programming
Hart to Hart
Magnum, P.I.
Matlock
Scandal

Hallmark Original Mystery Movies
Current series
 Chronicle Mysteries (2019–)
 Crossword Mysteries (2019–)
 A Puzzle to Die For (2019)
 Proposing Murder (2019)
 Abracadaver (2020)
 Terminal Descent (2021)
 Riddle Me Dead (2021)
 Curious Caterer (2022–)
 Dying For Chocolate (2022)
 Grilling Season (2023)
 Martha's Vineyard Mysteries (2020–)
 A Beautiful Place to Die (2020)
 Riddled With Deceit (2020)
 Poisoned in Paradise (2021)
 Ships in the Night (2021)
 Morning Show Mysteries (2018–)
 Murder, She Baked aka Hannah Swensen Mysteries (2015–)
 Mystery 101 (2019-)
 Signed, Sealed, Delivered aka Lost Letter Mysteries (2013–)

Former series
  Aurora Teagarden Mysteries (2015–2022)
 Darrow & Darrow (2017–2019)
 Emma Fielding Mysteries (2017–2019)
 The Site of Murder (2017)
 Past Malice (2018)
 More Bitter Than Death (2019)
 Fixer Upper Mysteries (2017–2018)
 Flower Shop Mysteries (2016)
 Garage Sale Mysteries (2013–2018)
 Gourmet Detective (2015–2020)
 Hailey Dean Mysteries (2016–2019)
 Jane Doe Mysteries (2005–2008)
 Matchmaker Mysteries (2019–2021)
 A Killer Engagement (2019)
 A Fatal Romance (2020)
 The Art of the Kill (2021)
 Mystery Woman (2003–2007)
 Picture Perfect Mysteries (2019–2020)
 Newlywed and Dead (2019)
 Dead Over Diamonds (2019)
 Exit, Stage Death (2020)
 Ruby Herring Mysteries (2019–2020)
 Silent Witness (2019)
 Her Last Breath (2019)
 Prediction Murder (2020)

Standalone movies
 The Mystery Cruise (2013)
 Along Came A Nanny (2014)
 Wedding Planner Mystery (2014)
 To Catch A Spy (2021)
 Redemption in Cherry Springs (2021)
 Cut, Color, Murder (2022)
 Francesca Quinn, PI (2022)
 Nikki & Nora: Sister Sleuths (2022)

Seasonal programming
"Miracles of Christmas", originally "The Most Wonderful Movies of Christmas" and later "The Most Wonderful Miracles of Christmas": On November 11, 2013, Hallmark Movie Channel started its first "The Most Wonderful Movies of Christmas" seasonal programming duplicating the main Hallmark Channel's "Countdown to Christmas". Included is A Very Happy Yule Log, a Christmas Eve/Christmas Day loop made up of a yule log presentation with Happy the Cat and Happy the Dog. In 2017, "A Happy Yule Log" was broadcast on November 22 (Thanksgiving Day), with abandoned piglet, Pip Squeak.

In March 2009, the network announced that it was partnering with the NYU Tisch School of the Arts’ Maurice Kanbar Institute of Film and TV to showcase short films by the school's students and alumni. The shorts began airing in October, and were also available for viewing online at the network's website hallmarkmoviechannel.com. Actor Alec Baldwin is a Tisch alum who served as one of the judges to determine which films would appear on the network.

See also
 List of Hallmark Channel Original Movies

References

External links

Hallmark Channel

Television channels and stations established in 2004
English-language television stations in the United States
Hallmark Cards
Studio City, Los Angeles
Movie channels in the United States
Television networks in the United States